Lucky Number is a 1951 Donald Duck cartoon featuring Donald Duck and his nephews Huey, Dewey, and Louie.

Plot
Donald Duck and his nephews Huey, Dewey, and Louie are busy working at their gas station when a radio station announces the winning numbers of a lottery for a new Zoom V-8 car. Donald is frustrated when his ticket does not have the winning numbers and throws away the ticket, but the trio hear that the radio announcer made an error and Donald's ticket has the winning numbers. Instead of telling the news to their uncle, the trio decide to pick up the car to surprise him. With the car they needed gas, Donald was in too bad a mood to comply and saying paying customers only. So the boys disguise their car, and one of the boys dresses up as a woman that got Donald's fancy, until he realized he was tricked by his nephews. With less than 10 minutes to spare, the trio rush to the radio station to pick up the car, and the station phone calls Donald about his nephews having a surprise for him. Upon returning to the gas station, Donald suspecting his new car being the boys' car pours oil sludge all over the new car, overfills the tires, and crushes it on the garage lift while the boys watch in disbelief. He laughs at the damage he has done to get back at the boys for tricking, believing he gave them what they deserved, until the radio announcer mentions his name as the lucky winner of the car, causing him to realize in horror he ended up destroying his own Zoom V-8 car, and all his ideals plans with it gone forever, faint out of embarrassment and shame. The boys on the other hand just shrug at each other thinking that their uncle just went crazy.

Voice cast
Clarence Nash as Donald Duck, Huey, Dewey and Louie

Home media
The short was released on November 11, 2008, on Walt Disney Treasures: The Chronological Donald, Volume Four: 1951-1961.

References

External links

1951 films
1951 animated films
Donald Duck short films
1950s Disney animated short films
Films directed by Jack Hannah
Films produced by Walt Disney
1950s English-language films
1950s American films